The 1887–88 Scottish Cup was the 15th season of Scotland's most prestigious football knockout competition. Renton won the competition for the second time after they beat Cambuslang 6–1 in the final. The result set a new record as the largest margin of victory in a Scottish Cup Final - a record that was equalled by Celtic in 1972 but has never been bettered.

Calendar

Teams
All 145 teams entered the competition in the first round.

First round
Aberdeen Rovers, Glasgow University, Mauchline, Nithsdale and Southern Athletic received a bye to the second round.

Matches

Replays

Second replay

Notes

Sources:

Second round
Heart of Midlothian, Kilmarnock, Lassodie, Oban, Plains and Vale of Leven Wanderers received a bye to the third round.

Matches

Replays

Notes

Sources:

Third round
Lindertis and Partick Thistle received a bye to the fourth round.

Matches

Replays

Sources:

Fourth round
Abercorn, Albion Rovers, Arbroath, Cambuslang, Carfin Shamrock, Cowlairs, Dundee Our Boys, Queen's Park, St Bernard's and Thistle received a bye to the fifth round.

Matches

Replays

Second replay

Third replay

Sources:

Fifth round

Matches

Sources:

Quarter-final

Matches

Replay

Sources:

Semi-finals

Matches

Replay

Sources:

Final

References

Cup
Scottish Cup seasons
Scot